Richard Ian Trotman (born 8 January 1972) is a former English cricketer.  Trotman was a right-handed batsman who bowled right-arm medium pace.  He was born at Keynsham, Somerset.

Trotman represented the Somerset Cricket Board in a single List A match against Bedfordshire in the 2nd round of the 1999 NatWest Trophy.  In his only List A match, he scored 2 runs and took 2 wickets at a bowling average of 15.00, with figures of 2/30 in the match.

References

External links
Richard Trotman at Cricinfo
Richard Trotman at CricketArchive

1972 births
Living people
People from Keynsham
Cricketers from Somerset
English cricketers
Somerset Cricket Board cricketers